Brockwell Meadows is a 4.3 hectare Local Nature Reserve in Kelvedon in Essex. It is owned by Kelevdon Parish Council and managed by the Council together with a group of local residents called the Brockwell Group.

This site has water meadow, woodland, a pond and hedgerows. The River Blackwater runs along the eastern boundary.

There is access from Riverside Way.

References

Local Nature Reserves in Essex
Meadows in Essex